Quitobaquito, also known as Quitobaquita or Quitovaquita is a populated place situated in Pima County, Arizona, United States. Its current name became official in 1917 as a result of a decision by the Board on Geographic Names. It is also the name of the nearby Quitobaquito Hills.

References

Populated places in Pima County, Arizona